Lucille Andrea George-Wout (born 29 February 1950) is a Curaçaoan politician currently serving as the second governor of Curaçao since 4 November 2013.

Political career
George-Wout was a member of parliament for the Partido MAN in the Island Council of Curaçao in the early 1990s. As a politician for the Party for the Restructured Antilles (PAR), she was speaker of the Parliament of the Netherlands Antilles from 1994 to 1998. She also served as minister for work and social affairs of the Netherlands Antilles for the same party between 1999 and 2001.

On 1 November 2013 Ronald Plasterk, minister of the interior and kingdom relations of the Netherlands, nominated George-Wout in the Council of Ministers of the Kingdom of the Netherlands, with her appointment commencing on 4 November 2013. She was sworn in by King Willem-Alexander of the Netherlands on the same day, becoming the second governor of Curaçao. George-Wout had to formally accept the office in a solemn session of the Estates of Curaçao. By acceding to the function of governor of Curaçao, George-Wout replaced Frits Goedgedrag, who left the office in November 2012 because of health problems. His functions had been temporarily performed by acting governor Adèle van der Pluijm-Vrede.

Personal life
Lucille George-Wout is married to Herman George.

References

1950 births
Living people
Governors of Curaçao
Government ministers of the Netherlands Antilles
Speakers of the Estates of the Netherlands Antilles
Members of the Estates of the Netherlands Antilles
Curaçao politicians
Curaçao women in politics
Partido MAN politicians
Party for the Restructured Antilles politicians
20th-century Dutch women politicians
20th-century Dutch politicians
21st-century Dutch women politicians
21st-century Dutch politicians
Women government ministers of the Netherlands Antilles